JNVS Sprl competing as Comtoyou Racing is a Belgian auto racing team based in Waterloo, Belgium. The team has raced in the TCR International Series, since 2017. Having also raced in the Fun Cup for many years.

Fun Cup
Having first entered the championship in 2014. The team raced in the series for many seasons with four or five cars. Having taken many great results, the team kept entering the series for many years. However, the team have never won the championship as of 2016. Frédéric Vervisch join the team sinds the 4td race at Spa. They have 2 Audi RS3 LMS, #1 and #6.

TCR International Series

Audi RS 3 LMS TCR (2017–)
After having raced in the Fun Cup, the team entered the 2017 TCR International Series with 2-time series' champion Stefano Comini driving an Audi RS 3 LMS TCR. 
Comini took the team's first podium position in the series, in the opening round held in Georgia.

They finished the season with a 3rd place for Stefano Comini.

Racing record
TCR International 2017

Stefano Comini P3 with 196 pts
Frederic Vervisch P10 with 84 pts
3 victories - 8 podiums

TCR Benelux 2017
Belgium - Spa :

Qualifying Long race : Comini/Van der Linda S. : P4

Sprint Race 1 : Comini P1

Sprint Race 2 : Comini P1

Sprint Race 3 : Van der Linde P2

Sprint Race 4 : Van der Linde P1

European VW Funcup 2017
Trophée des Fagnes - Spa : P9 (287) and P12 (291)
Trophée de Bourgogne - Dijon : P2 (287) and P3 (291)

References

External links
 

Belgian auto racing teams
TCR International Series teams
World Rallycross Championship teams
Audi in motorsport
Auto racing teams established in 2014